Asteridea chaetopoda  is a species of herb in the Asteraceae family, which is endemic to Western Australia, in the south-west.
It was first described in 1876 as Athrixia chaetopoda by Ferdinand von Mueller, and allocated to the genus, Asteridea, in 1980 by G. Kroner.
It is a perennial herb, growing on sandy soils, on limestone and on gypsum, to heights from 5 cm to 30 cm. Its yellow flowers may seen from August to November on salt lakes, stony rises, and dunes of Beard's Eremaean and South-West Provinces.

References

External links 
 Asteridea chaetopoda occurrence data from the Australasian Virtual Herbarium

chaetopoda
Endemic flora of Western Australia
Eudicots of Western Australia
Plants described in 1876
Taxa named by John Lindley